Fairfax is an unincorporated community in Clear Creek Township, Monroe County, in the U.S. state of Indiana.

History
Fairfax was founded sometime in the early 1830s. A post office was established at Fairfax in 1837, and remained in operation until it was discontinued in 1904.

Geography

References

Unincorporated communities in Monroe County, Indiana
Unincorporated communities in Indiana
Bloomington, Indiana